Chirothecia is a genus of jumping spiders that was first described by Władysław Taczanowski in 1878. Chirothecia is very similar to Bellota, but can be distinguished by the following characteristics: a much wider and taller cephalothorax (the width being 70–80% of the length and the height being 38–47% of the length); a much longer eye area (occupying 60–70% of the cephalothorax length); the posterior median eyes are always closer to the anterior lateral eyes than the posterior lateral eyes.

Species
 it contains thirteen species, found only in South America and Panama:
Chirothecia amazonica Simon, 1901 – Brazil
Chirothecia botucatuensis Bauab, 1980 – Brazil
Chirothecia clavimana (Taczanowski, 1871) (type) – Brazil, Guyana
Chirothecia crassipes Taczanowski, 1878 – Peru
Chirothecia daguerrei Galiano, 1972 – Argentina
Chirothecia euchira (Simon, 1901) – Brazil, Argentina
Chirothecia minima Mello-Leitão, 1943 – Argentina
Chirothecia rosea (F. O. Pickard-Cambridge, 1901) – Panama
Chirothecia semiornata Simon, 1901 – Brazil
Chirothecia soaresi Bauab, 1980 – Brazil
Chirothecia soesilae Makhan, 2006 – Suriname
Chirothecia uncata Soares & Camargo, 1948 – Brazil
Chirothecia wrzesniowskii Taczanowski, 1878 – Ecuador

References

Salticidae
Salticidae genera
Taxa named by Władysław Taczanowski
Spiders of South America